The Very Best of Marvin Gaye is the title of two compilations (American and European) by Motown artist Marvin Gaye.

UK edition

Released in 1994, The Very Best is the best-selling (and highest charting) Marvin Gaye album in the UK – selling over 250,000 copies, peaking at #3 in the UK charts, and receiving a million-plus sales certificate in 2001. The album featured an unreleased track ("Lucky, Lucky Me") that would also be released as a single.

Track listing
"I Heard It Through the Grapevine"
"What's Going On"
"Sexual Healing"
"You Are Everything" (with Diana Ross)
"It Takes Two" (with Kim Weston)
"Let's Get It On"
"Abraham, Martin & John"
"Too Busy Thinking About My Baby"
"How Sweet It Is (To Be Loved by You)"
"Mercy Mercy Me (The Ecology)"
"Stop, Look, Listen (To Your Heart)" (w/Diana Ross)
"You're All I Need to Get By" (w/Tammi Terrell)
"Ain't Nothing Like the Real Thing" (w/Tammi Terrell)
"Wherever I Lay My Hat (That's My Home)"
"The Onion Song" (w/Tammi Terrell)
"You Ain't Livin' Till You're Lovin'" (w/Tammi Terrell)
"Good Lovin' Ain't Easy to Come By (w/Tammi Terrell)
"That's the Way Love Is"
"Got to Give It Up, Pt. I"
"When Did You Stop Loving Me, When Did I Stop Loving You"
"Can I Get a Witness"
"Lucky, Lucky Me"

US edition

Released in the US in 2001, the two disc edition is a chronological look back at American R&B/soul singer Marvin Gaye's three decade-plus music career throughout his tenure in Motown Records in the 1960s and 1970s concluding with his final big hit, 1982's "Sexual Healing" from his brief tenure with Columbia Records before the singer's death in 1984. Re-released later in 2005 under Universal Records' Gold series, it has since been certified gold by the Recording Industry Association of America.

Track listing

Certifications

References

1994 greatest hits albums
2001 greatest hits albums
Marvin Gaye compilation albums
Albums produced by Norman Whitfield
Albums produced by Johnny Bristol
Albums produced by Harvey Fuqua
Albums produced by William "Mickey" Stevenson
Albums produced by Marvin Gaye
Albums produced by Leon Ware
Albums produced by Hal Davis
Albums produced by the Mizell Brothers
Albums produced by Berry Gordy
Albums produced by Ashford & Simpson
Albums produced by Smokey Robinson
Albums produced by Henry Cosby
Albums produced by Brian Holland
Albums produced by Lamont Dozier
Albums produced by Freddie Perren
Motown compilation albums